Dennis E. Puleston Ph.D (19 June 1940 – 29 June 1978) was an American archaeologist and ecologist. Puleston archaeology, biologyecology developed the ecological approach to the study of archaeology, looking at the manner in which humans adapt to their natural environment. His work involved pioneering interdisciplinarity methods which remain current to this day and led to a greater emphasis upon ecological and experimental archaeological research in the 80's and 90's. His work is still used to teach the importance of diversity in scientific interest, need for social relevance, and problem solving in archaeology classes due to the broadness of his approach. Puleston's work ranged from experiments in reconstruction and usefulness testing of chultuns or raised fields, building a traditional dugout canoe and using it to investigate otherwise unreachable areas, or challenging the belief that the Ancient Maya subsisted on a milpa agricultural complex – maize, beans, and squash.

Life and career 
Puleston was born to Dennis and Elizabeth Rhode Puleston. He has one brother, Peter, and two sisters, Sally and Jennifer. His father was a noted ornithologist sailor, explorer, painter and environmentalist. It is from him that the younger Dennis learned a love of adventure, the outdoors, and science.  According to puleston.org—a repository for a majority of Puleston's works and photographs from the field, Dennis “lived and worked in such places as the Canadian wilderness, the island of Moorea, Society Islands, and the tropical forests of Central America which he came to love deeply.”

Dennis attended high school at Bellport High School, in Brookhaven, New York, and upon graduating embarked on his own adventures. A great illustration of his adventures and eventual decision to become an archaeologist is found in the following excerpt from Harrison and Messenger's obituary:

Before beginning formal study of biology at Antioch College, he [Dennis] spent a season working with the National Film Board of Canada as assistant in the production of a cinematic study of tundra ecology. During the years of study at Antioch, Denny’s interest in archaeology developed through a series of contacts and field experiences. In 1960 he worked as a student assistant under Roland Force and Paul S. Martin in the Chicago Natural History Museum. It was Paul Martin who arranged a visit for Denny and a classmate to Tikal in Guatemala via a letter of introduction to Edwin S. Shook, then director of the project. When they arrived in Guatemala the pair found tickets to Tikal waiting for them and a warm welcome at the site. For Denny the visit stretched into the 1961 field season, then another, and another….

As a graduate student at the University of Pennsylvania, Dennis met and married Olga Stavrakis. Dennis and Olga had a son, Cedric, and a daughter, Lyda.  During many of Dennis's adventures his family would accompany him. His brother, Peter and his wife, Olga were partners and contributors to a number of his projects, and his son, Cedric is now in conducting post-doc work in the field.

Puleston's career was intimately tied to Tikal. Originally invited to join the Tikal Project in 1961 by Edwin Shook, the Project Director, Dennis entered graduate school at the University of Pennsylvania Museum in 1964 continuing his work at Tikal under the direction of William Coe. Puleston became interested in how the ordinary Tikal citizen lived and focused his research on population and subsistence asking questions about how the Classic Maya managed their environment in such a way that it could feed large populations without degrading the delicate ecological balance of the sub tropical forest.

At the time, archaeological research focused on the central mapped area of Tikal, representing the urban and ceremonial core of the polity. Dennis began to explore the surrounding jungle in order to learn where settlement dropped off and the agricultural area began. Up until that time, few archaeologists ventured regularly into the jungle and many of the smaller sites mapped today remained unknown. Dennis searched for the city limits to try to determine the site and, ultimately, the population of Tikal and to this end he began exploring and mapping the smaller sites outside the city center. He then developed a major research program, called the Sustaining Area Project, which mapped four 12 km strips extending out from the center of Tikal.

Using a compass and pace method for the mapping he and his research teams were able to quickly and accurately cover large areas of dense jungle within which they discovered a number of previously unknown small sites, causeways, an enormous earthworks north of Tikal and hundreds of housemounds and residential platforms. Based on this work, Puleston proposed a new population estimate for Tikal of at least 80,000 inhabitants within the boundaries defined by the earthworks and by drops in population density. He suggested that the earthworks may have served as a defensive fortifications (the first discovered in the Maya Lowlands at that time) and probably the northern urban border of the site. He studied caves and sacred writing to expand knowledge on the spiritual beliefs of the ancient Maya. And, he developed several important hypotheses on Maya subsistence and agriculture that are discussed below.

Puleston died in 1978, struck by lightning while viewing a thunderstorm from the summit of El Castillo, Chichen Itza in Yucatan, Mexico.

Approach to archaeology 

While several of Puleston's contemporaries were concerned with human interactions with nature -- cultural ecology, Dennis's approach was novel in its ability to juxtapose the micro and macro perspectives of these environments into one coherent argument. Traditional archaeological methods rest on theory interpreted through anthropological observations and repetition of artifactual data from site to site. However, a more encompassing approach was needed to address the problems Puleston was studying. Therefore, he set forth to test many of his theories through experiments in the environment. A wave of such approaches was evident in the aftermath of Puleston's death, as evident in the book, Maya Subsistence: A Tribute to Dennis E. Puleston and In the recordings of the proceedings of Puleston's memorial conference (available at https://web.archive.org/web/20120515225809/http://findingaids.princeton.edu/getAid?eadid=WC012&kw= ), entitled "The History and Development of Maya Subsistence, which was held in October 1979 in Minneapolis. Unfortunately, arguments of environmental change since the 8th and 9th century decline of Lowland Maya societies have been convincing and have been used to undermine the experimental approach to archaeology to the point that it is now rarely practiced. Consequently, there is a waning in the study of ecology and archaeology through these experiments. Despite this, there are still questions to be answered through experimental means and a portion of the field, particularly in Europe, but also including American researchers like Clark Erickson and John P. Hart are actively involved in experimental archaeology to this day.  Below are brief synopses of two of Puleston's works in experimental archaeology.

Research into chultuns 
Chultuns are man-made holes in the ground and are found in many parts of Mesoamerica. They come in several forms, but they are all called by the same moniker. In 1971, Puleston wrote an article entitled, An Experimental Approach to the Function of Classic Maya Chultuns. Within this article, he shows that, despite the common name, there are several different types of chultuns and he suggests that these different styles were indicative of differing uses. In this article, he asserted that while the first chultuns documented where single chambers with plastered walls for holding and collecting water, the chultuns in the Tikal region were different in shape, not plastered, and did not hold water.

Dr. Puleston conducted three experiments to test the chultuns. First, he filled a chultun with water and watched it drain away quickly. This lent credibility to his assertion that chultuns of this region were not for water storage. Next, Puleston built a chultun. To do so he created stone tools similar to those that would have been used to construct one 1,000 years ago. Upon completion, in 1966, Puleston filled the chultun with a diversity of locally produced dietary contributions, like maize, beans, squash, and cassava. Every two weeks, Puleston would pull the items out and document their state of preservation. These items were weighed, examined, and photographed. The observations were then compared to a control group that was store above ground. However, the control group was quickly consumed by rodents and insects. While the chultun stored produce was not consumed, the end products were also not consumable. Upon completion of this 11-week experiment, Puleston (1971) noted that, “while the chultun apparently offered valuable protection from vermin, it evidently could not be used for the storage of maize, beans, or squash”. The following year Puleston tried the experiment once more, but this time he added a nut from a local tree – the Brosium alicastrum (ramon) to the mix. O.F. Cook (1935) is cited in Puleston's article as the originator of the idea that chultuns could have been used to store ramon nuts, however, without Puleston's experiment this assertion had never been taken seriously. What Puleston found changed many archaeologists' opinion of the ramon's utility and its possible utilization in ancient Maya society. Not only did the ramon nuts survive the 13-week experiment that once again devastated the comparable crops, after 13 months, ”they were still in excellent condition and completely edible”. Puleston drew on these experiments for further work on the ramon as an alternative staple in the Maya diet. The resultant argument can be seen in a number of the linked articles below, and a synopsis of his findings is included below.

Legacy 
Puleston was instrumental in the wave of investigation of subsistence ecology that followed his demise. A book, Maya Subsistence: Studies in Memory of Dennis E. Puleston, was written in dedication to Dennis and his passion. Many of Dennis's friends and colleagues contributed to this book, in 1982. But the story did not end there. While there is a dwindling amount of study on ecological aspects of archaeology and even less utilization of experimental archaeology in the field today, there are some who remain dedicated to the pursuit of these answers and for many modern applied and/or experimental archaeologists, Puleston is an inspiration.

In 2015, British Archaeological Reports published a collection of Puleston's field work, edited and revised by Olga Stavrakis-Puleston. This volume represents the only full report of Puleston's Tikal survey and also covers several related sub-projects, including excavations of Tikal satellite sites.

Bibliography
Several of Dennis E. Puleston's published articles are listed here. However, much more of his and related articles, both published and unpublished can be found at www.puleston.org.

 1967: Defensive Earthworks at Tikal
 1973: Dissertation: Ancient Maya Settlement Patterns and Environment at Tikal, Guatemala: Implications for Subsistence Madels
 1977: The Art and Archaeology of Hydraulic Agriculture in the Maya Lowlands
 1978: Terracing, Raised Fields, and Tree Cropping in the Maya Lowlands: A New Perspective on the Geography of Power
 1978: Ancient Maya Settlement Patterns in the Peten, Guatemala, with Don S. Rice
 2015: Settlement and Subsistence:  The assembled work of Dennis E. Puleston (Field research 1961-1972)  http://www.barpublishing.com/settlement-and-subsistence-in-tikal.html

Notes

References

1940 births
1978 deaths
Deaths from lightning strikes
20th-century American archaeologists